The Colorado River Compact is a 1922 agreement among the seven southwest U.S. states that fall within the drainage basin of the Colorado River. The pact governs the allocation of the river's water rights. The agreement, originally proposed by attorney Delph Carpenter, was signed at a meeting at Bishop's Lodge, near Santa Fe, New Mexico, by representatives of the seven states the Colorado river and its tributaries pass through on the way to Mexico.

Law of the River
The Colorado River is managed and operated under numerous compacts, federal laws, an international treaty, court decisions and decrees, contracts, and regulatory guidelines collectively known as "the Law of the River."

Provisions
The compact divides the river basin into two areas, the Upper Division (comprising Colorado, New Mexico, Utah and Wyoming) and the Lower Division (Nevada, Arizona and California). The compact requires the Upper Basin states not to deplete the flow of the river below  during any period of ten consecutive years. Based on rainfall patterns observed in the years before the treaty's signing in 1922, the amount specified in the compact was assumed to allow a roughly equal division of water between the two regions. The states within each basin were required to divide their  share allotment among themselves. The compact enabled the widespread irrigation of the Southwest, as well as the subsequent development of state and federal water works projects under the United States Bureau of Reclamation. Such projects included the Hoover Dam and Lake Powell.

The current specific annual allotments in the Lower Basin were established in 1928 as part of the Boulder Canyon Project, while the current specific annual allotments in the Upper Basin were established by the Upper Colorado River Basin Compact of 1948. They are:

In addition to this,  of Colorado River water is allocated to Mexico, pursuant to the treaty relating to the use of waters of the Colorado and Tijuana rivers and of the Rio Grande, signed February 3, 1944, and its supplementary protocol signed November 14, 1944. Also, the lower basin can get an additional  in surplus conditions.

The compact was the fruit of several years of negotiations among the states. The seven states had previously formed the League of the Southwest in 1917 to promote development along the river. In 1921, Congress authorized the states to enter into a compact for allocation of the river resources. The agreement was approved by Congress in 1922, the same year it was signed. Colorado River Compact was signed by the delegates from the seven Colorado River Basin states: Wyoming, Colorado, Utah and New Mexico were designated Upper Basin states and California, Arizona and Nevada as the Lower Basin states. This compact determined that the water would be shared equally among the upper and lower basin states.  Prior to the compact, the name of the river was standardized along its length. Previously the portion of the river upstream from its confluence with the Green River had been known locally as the "Grand River". The change was opposed by many local residents in Utah and Colorado, and the new name was enforced locally by acts of the state legislatures in both states in the early 1920s. One of the major concerns both today and back in the 1920s was the expanding population, and this increased the demand for water, particularly in California.  In more recent years, mainly because of Las Vegas, Nevada has been looking for more use of the Colorado River.

In 1934, Arizona, unhappy with California's decision to dam and divert the river, called out the National Guard and even commissioned a two-boat "navy." The matter was eventually settled in court.

The agreement was controversial even at the time, however. Arizona, for example, was dissatisfied with the lower basin allotment.  Led by Fred Colter, the state refused to sign the agreement, and did not do so until two months after Colter's death in 1944. The specific allotments were disputed by Arizona until the United States Supreme Court upheld the amount in the 1963 decision in Arizona v. California. The agreement ended many years of dispute, clearing the way for the Central Arizona Project, authorized by Congress in 1968 – though the Supreme Court has been asked to readjust Arizona's water allocation a half-dozen times in the interim. Mexico was able to gain some of the river rights, and Arizona took steps as well to protect its water rights and keep California from gaining too large of a share, which ultimately led to the Arizona v. California Supreme Court case. The case lasted 11 years and cost over $5 million, requiring the work product of over 50 lawyers. Based on an assumption that California was using more than its contractually allotted water amount, Arizona set the precedent of the Supreme Court using water rights. The case ultimately decided that the Boulder Canyon Provision was correct for the lower states (which are California, Nevada, and Arizona). While the Court ultimately ruled in favor of Arizona, it agreed with California's interpretation that how it received surplus water supplies was correct.

Future developments and issues
Since the development of the Colorado River Compact, California has been using the surplus water that has been left over from other states. With increasing population growth in the Southwest there is concern that this surplus soon will not exist for California's use. In 2001, Secretary of the Interior Bruce Babbitt signed an interim agreement, determining how water surplus from the Colorado River will be allocated between the states, and creating a 15-year period to allow California time to put conservation methods in place to reduce the state's water usage and dependence on Colorado River water.

There is also concern regarding Nevada's increasing population and the state's water usage. Nevada, with the smallest water allocation in the lower river basin, may find in the near future that the water supplied by the Colorado River will not meet the state's growing needs. In 2008 Southern Nevada Water Authority General Manager Pat Mulroy said that she does not support a water reallocation. This is because all of the states in the river basin have experienced growth she says that it is unlikely that Nevada's allocation would increase, and it could even decrease. Instead Nevada, like California, may have to work on conservation methods as well as finding other water sources to support the state's growing population.

Development was the prime concern of the Colorado River Compact, when signed in 1922. Using and reusing the river water as well as frequent damming results in an unfavorable environment for native fish species. Dams block fish passage, reduce natural silt deposition along flood plains and in deltas, and change water temperaturesall negatively impacting the natural ecosystem.

The high water usage has also caused the Colorado River Delta, located in Mexico, to significantly deteriorate. Once a lush and green area from the high amounts of silt deposit, the plentiful ecosystem has now all but disappeared. The Colorado River had been over allocated since the beginning of its time, as during the signing of the Colorado River Compact, the flows were vastly overestimated and much more generous than they should have been. It was originally estimated to have 17 million acre-feet a year, but even prior to the drought flows have often been less than a third of that.

Renegotiation
Subsequent tree ring studies, however, have concluded that the long-term average water flow of the Colorado is significantly less. Many analysts have concluded that when the compact was negotiated, the period used as the basis for "average" flow of the river (1905–1922) included periods of abnormally high precipitation, and that the recent drought in the region is in fact a return to historically typical patterns. The decrease in precipitation has led to widespread dropping of reservoir levels in the region, in particular at Lake Powell, created by the Glen Canyon Dam in 1963, where the exposure of long-inundated canyons has prompted calls for the reservoir to be permanently drained and decommissioned.

In December 2007, a set of interim guidelines on how to allocate Colorado River water in the event of shortages was signed by the Secretary of the Interior. The guidelines are described as interim because they extend through 2026, and, "acknowledging the potential for impacts due to climate change and increased hydrologic variability," interim guidelines provide "the opportunity to gain valuable operating experience for the management of Lake Powell and Lake Mead, particularly for low reservoir conditions...whether during the interim period or thereafter." The agreement specifies three levels of shortage conditions, depending on the level of Lake Mead:  
Light shortage.
Heavy shortage.
Extreme shortage.

On August 15, 2008, Arizona senator John McCain called for the compact to be renegotiated.  Due to the senator's position as the Republican Party nominee in the 2008 U.S. Presidential Election and Colorado's swing state status, criticism of the compact may have gained national significance.

Minute 319.

Minute 319 also specifies that deliveries to Mexico will be reduced under drought conditions.

An agreement was reached by seven Western states in 2019 on a plan to manage the Colorado River amid a 19-year drought.

See also
Colorado River dispute
Colorado River Storage Project
Colorado River Board of California
Course of the Colorado River

References

Further reading
 Norris Hundley.  Water and the West: The Colorado River Compact and the Politics of Water in the American West (University of California Press, 2009) 415 pp. the standard scholarly history; 
 
 Jason Robison. "Review of Hundley, Water and the West," H-Water, H-Net Reviews. September, 2010. online
 Sandra Postel. The Colorado River Delta Series, National Geographic. March through May, 2013. online
 Daniel Tyler. Silver Fox of the Rockies: Delphus E. Carpenter and Western Water Compacts, (Norman: University of Oklahoma Press) 2003.

History of the American West
History of the Southwestern United States
United States interstate compacts
Colorado River
Water management authorities in the United States
Water in Colorado
Water law in the United States
Colorado law
New Mexico law
Utah law
Wyoming law
Nevada law
Arizona law
California law